Admiral Sir Charles Gordon Ramsey, KCB (4 December 1882 – 19 December 1966) was a Royal Navy officer who became Commander-in-Chief, Coast of Scotland. He was later appointed aide de camp to King George VI.

Naval career
Ramsey joined the Royal Navy as a cadet in 1897. As a midshipman, he was posted to the protected cruiser HMS Charybdis in early 1900. He was promoted to lieutenant on 30 June 1904, and commander on 31 December 1915.

He served in World War I, at one time as captain of HMS Pasley, and was present at the Battle of Jutland. He was appointed Commander of the 2nd Battle Squadron in 1935 and Commander-in-Chief, Rosyth in 1939, serving in that role during World War II until retirement in 1942.

Family
In 1912, Ramsey married Lucy Clare Hancock; they had one child, a daughter, Patricia, who married Commander Henry de Chair in 1936.

References

1882 births
1966 deaths
Royal Navy admirals of World War II
Knights Commander of the Order of the Bath
Royal Navy personnel of World War I
People from Southsea
Military personnel from Portsmouth
Royal Navy officers of World War I